István Iglódi (29 April 1944 – 3 December 2009) was a Hungarian actor and stage director. He appeared in over 65 films and television shows between 1965 and 2008.

Selected filmography
 The Testament of Aga Koppanyi (1967)
 The Upthrown Stone (1969)
 Trotta (1971)
 Husaren in Berlin (1971)
 Photography (1973)

References

External links

1944 births
2009 deaths
Hungarian male film actors
People from Baranya County
20th-century Hungarian male actors
Hungarian male television actors